Planaria torva is a species of planarian in the family Planariidae. When an individual is cut into pieces, each piece has the ability to regenerate into a fully formed individual.

Diet 
The food of P. torva consists of freshwater gastropods, tubificid worms, and freshwater arthropods, such as isopods of the genus Asellus and chironomid larvae, although it shows a clear preference for snails. In the United Kingdom, P. torva is a successful predator of the invasive New Zealand mud snail (Potamopyrgus jenkinsi).

References 

Continenticola